Ainara Manterola Ikutza (born 19 June 1995) is a Spanish football defender who most recently played for Añorga. She is an under-17 and under-19 international.

Career
After gaining attention for some of her performances at youth level for Orioko, Manterola joined Real Sociedad at the age of 16 and played in the centre-back position. After five years at Real Sociedad, Manterola transferred to Oiartzun for the start of the 2016–17 season. On 4 January 2017, having played 13 out of the 14 fixtures prior, Manterola tore her cruciate ligament. The injury meant that she would be ruled out of playing the rest of the season.

Personal life
Manterola comes from a sporting family and was born in Orio, Spain. Her great-grandfather, Batista Oliden, was a rower, as were her two grandfathers. In addition to this, her father, Joseba, is a football coach, her mother, Isabel, was a basketball player and her sister, Leire, is a footballer. Oliden won the Kontxako Bandera a record thirteen times.

References

1995 births
Living people
Spanish women's footballers
Footballers from the Basque Country (autonomous community)
Primera División (women) players
Oiartzun KE players
Real Sociedad (women) players
Women's association football defenders